Justice Burgess or Burges may refer to:

Brian L. Burgess, associate justice of the Vermont Supreme Court
Gavon D. Burgess, associate justice of the Supreme Court of Missouri
Tristam Burges, chief justice of the Rhode Island Supreme Court
Walter S. Burgess, associate justice of the Rhode Island Supreme Court

See also
Judge Burgess (disambiguation)